Laylow may refer to:

Laylow, the French rapper
Laylow, the 2006 debut album by trip hop group cirKus
Laylower, the 2007 second album by cirKus
"Laylow", a song by British rock band the Darkness from the deluxe edition of their 2019 album Easter Is Cancelled
Laylow, a location in Ladbroke Grove, London
Laylow Films, American film production company

See also
Lay Low, Icelandic artist and singer
Lay Low (disambiguation)